Osmakasaurus (meaning "canyon lizard", ósmaka meaning "canyon" in the Lakota language) is a genus of herbivorous iguanodontian dinosaur. It is a basal iguanodontian which lived during the Early Cretaceous period (Valanginian age) in what is now Buffalo Gap of South Dakota, United States. It is known from the Chilson Member of the Lakota Formation. This genus was named by Andrew T. McDonald in 2011 and the type species is O. depressus.

Discovery and naming
The holotype, USNM 4753, was discovered by Nelson Horatio Darton in 1896 within a layer of the Lakota Formation. The type species O. depressus was previously referred to as Camptosaurus depressus, and was first described in 1909 by Charles W. Gilmore. It was assigned to the genus Planicoxa as Planicoxa depressa in 2008. In 2011, it was assigned to the new genus Osmakasaurus.

References 

Iguanodonts
Valanginian life
Early Cretaceous dinosaurs of North America
Cretaceous geology of South Dakota
Paleontology in South Dakota
Fossil taxa described in 2011
Ornithischian genera